is a fantasy action role-playing game developed by K2 LLC and published by Marvelous Entertainment for Sony PlayStation Portable.

Story
In a realm forgotten by history, humans, elves, halflings and other assorted races lived together in harmony in an untainted paradise surrounded by thick green forests and crystal clear streams. However, this tranquility was abruptly shattered by the roar of demons as the Dark Lord returned to reclaim his throne as the ruler of these lands. This set off a series of bloody battles as all races become ensnared in the violent conflict.

After years of fierce fighting, the Dark Lord was eventually sealed away by the hands of as hero named Rulzult. However, the damage had been done. All the demon blood spilled during the war caused the land to become cursed and the sky lost its light. This once serene paradise became known as "the Cursed Land." It entrapped its inhabitants and filled them with despair, causing each waking moment to feel like an eternity.

One day, a brave youth awakens in this land, unable to recall who he/she is and having no recollection of his/her past. The story continues, following the unknown youth on a journey of discovery to find his/her lost memories and determine the future of this forsaken land.

Gameplay
The player fights against monsters to obtain new items and equipment. Five races are available for your character: human, dwarf, halfling, elf, and machine. Additionally, four initial job classes are available—Fighter, Mage, Priest, and Thief. Additional job classes can be acquired through job cards dropped by monsters in certain areas; these include Anchor, Knight, Samurai, and Ninja. At any time, each character may pick up to two job subclasses in addition to their main job class, and certain attributes of that subclass will carry over into gameplay (such as a Fighter being able to cast spells with a Mage or Priest subclass). Actions during combat will change depending on the weapons equipped, and each of the numerous weapon types is only equipable to a certain subset of job classes. After building up a gauge through combat actions, a character can perform a special attack. Different special attacks can be performed when equipping different weapons.

Reception
The game received "mixed or average" reviews according to the review aggregation website Metacritic. GameSpot gave the game 5.9 and IGN 6.5, citing the lack of in game story and the lack of clarity in the side quest.

Sequels
Valhalla Knights 2 released for the PlayStation Portable in North America on October 1, 2008, this installment expanded on the previous game by adding more races and improving the combat system.

Valhalla Knights: Eldar Saga was released for Wii in North America on September 29, 2009. The game featured online cooperative play.

Valhalla Knights 3 was released on the PlayStation Vita in May 2013.

References

External links
Valhalla Knights official website

2006 video games
PlayStation Portable games
PlayStation Portable-only games
Role-playing video games
Marvelous Entertainment
Marvelous Entertainment franchises
Video games developed in Japan
Video games featuring protagonists of selectable gender
Rising Star Games games
Multiplayer and single-player video games